Joël Jeannot (born 23 September 1965) is a male French Olympic wheelchair racer and handisport activist. From 2007 he started competing in handbikes, winning a lot of French championships as well as several world championships in para-cycling.

At the 2004 Olympic Games, he finished 7th in the demonstration sport of Men's 1,500 m wheelchair. He also participated in the 2004 Summer Paralympics, where he took gold in the 10000 metre race and silver in the 4×400 metre relay. Four years earlier, at the 2000 Paralympics, he won a gold medal in the 4×400 metre relay.

He has also won the wheelchair division of the London Marathon in 2003 in a record time, and finished second in the Boston Marathon the following year.

He won the 2003 World Championships in Athletics 1500 m event.

References

External links 
 
 
 
  

1965 births
Living people
French male athletes
French male wheelchair racers
Olympic wheelchair racers of France
Wheelchair racers at the 2004 Summer Olympics
Paralympic athletes of France
Paralympic wheelchair racers
Paralympic gold medalists for France
Paralympic silver medalists for France
Athletes (track and field) at the 1996 Summer Paralympics
Athletes (track and field) at the 2000 Summer Paralympics
Athletes (track and field) at the 2004 Summer Paralympics
Cyclists at the 2012 Summer Paralympics
Cyclists at the 2016 Summer Paralympics
Medalists at the 2000 Summer Paralympics
Medalists at the 2004 Summer Paralympics
Medalists at the 2012 Summer Paralympics
Paralympic medalists in athletics (track and field)
Paralympic medalists in cycling